Higgins v. Keuffel, 140 U.S. 428 (1891), was a United States Supreme Court case in which the Court held a label describing the contents of a container is not subject to copyright.

References

External links
 

1891 in United States case law
United States copyright case law
United States Supreme Court cases
United States Supreme Court cases of the Fuller Court